"The Stalls of Barchester Cathedral" is a ghost story by British writer  M. R. James, originally published in 1910. It is included in his collection More Ghost Stories of an Antiquary.

Plot summary 
Archdeacon Pultney of Barchester Cathedral dies mysteriously and the new Archdeacon Haynes takes his place. Haynes is very talented and performs the duties of his office with great zeal, however he is haunted by the carved figures in the stalls of Barchester Cathedral.

Adaptations
The story was adapted in 1971 for BBC's A Ghost Story for Christmas as The Stalls of Barchester.

References

External links

 
Full text of "The Stall of Barchester Cathedral"

A Podcast to the Curious: Episode 13 - The Stalls of Barchester Cathedral

Short stories by M. R. James
1910 short stories
Short stories adapted into films
Horror short stories
Cathedrals in fiction